Filippo Casoni (6 March 1733 – 9 October 1811) was a Roman Catholic cardinal, the last governor of Avignon before the annexation to France.

Biography
On 4 May 1794, he was consecrated bishop by Hyacinthe-Sigismond Gerdil, Cardinal-Priest of Santa Cecilia, with Ottavio Boni, Titular Archbishop of Nazianzus, and Michele di Pietro, Titular Bishop of Isauropolis, serving as co-consecrators.

References

1733 births
1811 deaths
19th-century Italian cardinals
Apostolic Nuncios to Spain
18th-century Italian Roman Catholic bishops
Cardinals created by Pope Pius VII